The House of Gjorgje Karanovski is a historical house in Galičnik that is listed as Cultural heritage of North Macedonia. It is in ownership of one branch of the family of Karanovski.

Family history
The family of Karanovski shares roots with the families of Karkinci and Čalovci.

See also
House of Kuze Frčkovski
House of Mane Šulevski
House of Petre and Mile Želčevski
House of Velimir Gjinovski
House of Mitre Gjozinski and Velimir Čangovski
House of Riste and Blaže Melovski
House of Gjorgji Pulevski

References

External links
 National Register of objects that are cultural heritage (List updated to December 31, 2012) (In Macedonian)
 Office for Protection of Cultural Heritage (In Macedonian)

Galičnik
Cultural heritage of North Macedonia
Historic houses